Holman Autry Band consists of 4 Madison County, GA natives: Brodye Brooks (lead guitar), Casey King (Vocals and Bass Guitar), Josh Walker (Vocals and Rhythm Guitar), Brandon Myers (drums)

Influences include Lynyrd Skynyrd, The Allman Brothers Band, Gov’t Mule, Stevie Ray Vaughan, Ronnie Milsap, Eagles, Eric Clapton, Metallica, Hank Williams, Sr., and many other musicians with great expressive talent.

History 
Holman Autry Band, after only being together for just over 14 years, has won the “Athens, GA Battle of the Bands” and sold out the Georgia Theatre in Athens, GA many times, and so many other great accomplishments together it's hard to name them all. The band has had the pleasure of playing venues all over the States of Georgia, South Carolina, Tennessee, North Carolina, and Florida and are always welcome where they perform. The band consists of 4 self-taught musicians. Brodye Brooks (Lead Guitar and Vocals), Casey King (Vocals and Bass Guitar), Josh Walker (Vocals and Rhythm Guitar), Brandon Myers (Drums) They had late night jam sessions as teenagers and complement each other in such a way that can only be present through learning to play together.

Sounds 
Holman Autry Band has a very distinct sound. This makes categorization into a particular genre very difficult. Holman Autry Band would most often fall into the Southern rock to Country rock category. However, Holman Autry Band and their fans prefer to consider their genre a new type of country music entitled “Black Label Country.” Some of their songs depict the “I’m not taking it anymore” attitude with songs like “Calling You Out” and “By Any Other Name.”  Holman Autry Band will also show you their exceptional musical talent with “Fruition”, along with their love for music with “Glory Days.”  They will also display fun-loving songs such as “Whiskey Wagon” and “Dark Haired Woman.”  With songs such as “Wildest Dreams,” “Summer Day” and “This One’s for you”, they will show their sensitive side as well; the latter being a tribute to their fans.
Holman Autry Band is known for the way they do cover songs. They will take a song, no matter how popular or unpopular, and revive it. Exceptional cover songs such as the Allman Brothers’ “Midnight Rider” and "Come and Go Blues” and David Allan Coe’s “The Ride” make it difficult to hear the song played in its original form after hearing it played with the incomparable stylings of the Holman Autry Band.

Discography 
Holman Autry Band (Self Titled)

Tracks
1. Whiskey Wagon2. Glory Days3. Good at Lovin’ You4. Press On5. By Any Other Name6. St. Andrews Cross7. Fruition8. Dark Haired Woman9. Wildest Dreams10. Callin' You Out11. Summer Day12. A Night or Two13. This One's For You

Sweet Southern Wind

Tracks
1. Sweet Southern Wind2. Hear Me Callin'3. The Next Time4. Still Loud, Still Proud5. In A Little While6. Gypsy7. Long Nights8. New Breed9. Watch You Go10. I Ain't Bitter11. State Of Peace

Nashville Sessions

Tracks
1. Fruition2. St. Andrew's Cross3. Dark Haired Woman4. Press On5. Fruition 2

See also
Southern rockCountry rockInstrumental rock

References 
Ben Munroe, Mainstreet NewsDon Brooks (Manager: Holman Autry Band)Holman Autry Band Touring, Inc.Holman Autry Band Official Website

External links
 Mainstreet NewsGeorgia Theatre

American country rock groups
American southern rock musical groups
Rock music groups from Georgia (U.S. state)